Yarkanré, also spelt Yarkanre, Yarkance or Yarkancé, is a commune in the Gounghin Department of Kouritenga Province in the Centre-Est region of Burkina Faso. It had a population of 770 in 2006.

Demographics

Neighbourhoods

References 

Populated places in the Centre-Est Region